Gahnia decomposita is a tussock-forming perennial in the family Cyperaceae, that is native to southern parts of Western Australia.

References

decomposita
Plants described in 1878
Flora of Western Australia
Taxa named by George Bentham